Pouteria franciscana is a species of plant in the family Sapotaceae. It is endemic to Brazil.

References

Flora of Brazil
franciscana
Least concern plants
Taxonomy articles created by Polbot
Taxa named by Charles Baehni